MiniSquadron is a video game developed by British developer Supermono Studios, released on November 18, 2009. It is a plane-based shooter game. Players can unlock multiple planes and battle with them.

Critical reception
The game has a Metacritic score of 87% based on 7 critic reviews.

SlideToPlay said " MiniSquadron deserves all the respect and adoration in the world. It's one of those games that hits the spot in the ways that matter. Go ahead and skip that delicious McLatte, and buy this exceptional shooting game instead. " 148 wrote "MiniSquadron is an elegant, intuitive 2D shooter that should delight genre fans and total newbies alike. The difficulty is well balanced, the presentation is great, and blowing stuff up is just daggone fun." TouchGen said "Mini Squadron is a fantastic shooter. Combining a retro feel, with something that feels fresh and new. Add in great pick-up-and-play gameplay and a hectic multiplayer experience (local only), and I can't recommend it enough for shooter fans. " TouchArcade said "It is a well-rounded package that can be breezed through in a couple of hours, but offers you replayability as you unlock and learn to master the many different planes composing your sizable squadron. " PocketGamerUK said "Offers the pick-up-and-playability of the old skool shooter, combined with great graphics and surprising deep gameplay." AppSmile "As much as we want to apply the 5-Dimple tag to this game, its lack of online multiplayer and leaderboards currently drops MiniSquadron to a solid 4-Dimple score. " Eurogamer said "It's a simple game, then, but an extremely polished and engaging one. "

References

2009 video games
Android (operating system) games
IOS games
Shooter video games
Video games developed in the United Kingdom
GameClub games